Isarda village is located in Chauth ka Barwara tehsil of Sawai Madhopur district, Rajasthan, India.

History
Isarda was a Thikana estate that was founded in the early 17th century as a feudal vassal state to the erstwhile Kingdom of Jaipur.

References

Villages in Sawai Madhopur district